The Catholic Church in Egypt is presently composed of an exempt Latin missionary jurisdiction and 14 Eastern Catholic (arch)eparchies (mainly the Coptic Catholic Patriarchate's province), but also yielded over 90 titular sees.

Current dioceses

Latin 
(Exempt, i.e. directly subject to the Holy See) 
 Apostolic Vicariate of Alexandria of Egypt (Latin)

Eastern Catholic 
 Alexandrian Rite
 Coptic Catholic Patriarchate of Alexandria and its Egyptian suffragans :
Coptic Catholic Eparchy of Alexandria (Patriarch's proper eparchy)
Coptic Catholic Eparchy of Abu Qirqas
Coptic Catholic Eparchy of Asyut 
Coptic Catholic Eparchy of Guizeh 
Coptic Catholic Eparchy of Ismaïlia 
Coptic Catholic Eparchy of Luxor 
Coptic Catholic Eparchy of Minya 
Coptic Catholic Eparchy of Sohag

 Byzantine Rite
 Melkite Greek Catholic Territory Dependent on the Patriarch of Egypt, Sudan and South Sudan

 Antiochian Rite
 Maronite Catholic Eparchy of Cairo 
 Syriac Catholic Eparchy of Cairo (Syrian)

 Armenian Rite
 Armenian Catholic Eparchy of Alexandria

 Chaldean Rite
 Chaldean Catholic Eparchy of Cairo

Former sees

Titular sees 
 Metropolitan titular sees (one in each Late Roman province) : Antinoë (for Thebais Prima), Leontopolis in Augustamnica (for Augustamnica Secunda), Nubia *, Oxyrynchus (for Arcadia Aegypti), Pelusium (for Augustamnica Prima), Pelusium *, Ptolemais in Thebaide (for Thebais Secunda)
 Other Archiepiscopal titular sees : Damiata (Crusader see; geographically identical with Tamiathis, now Damietta)
 Episcopal titular sees : Agnus, Alphocranon, Andropolis, Antæopolis, Aphnæum, Aphroditopolis, Apollonopolis magna, Apollonopolis parva, Arabia, Arsinoë in Arcadia, Athribis, Babylon, Bubastis, Busiris, Butus, Cabasa, Casius, Cleopatris, Clysma, Coprithis, Coptus, Cusæ, Cynopolis in Ægypto, Cynopolis in Arcadia, Diocletianoplis in Thebaide, Diospolis inferior, Diospolis superior, Geras, Heliopolis in Augustamnica, Hephæstus, Heracleopolis magna, Hermonthis, Hermopolis parva, Hypselis, Iotapa in Palestina, Latopolis, Letopolis, Mareotes, Massimianopolis in Thebaide, Memphis, Menelaites, Metelis, Naucratis, Nicius, Nilopolis, Oasis magna, Ombi, Onuphis, Ostracine, Pachnemunis, Panephysis, Panopolis, Paralus, Petra in Ægypto, Phacusa, Pharan, Pharbæthus, Phatanus, Phelbes, Philæ, Phragonis, Pselchis, Rhinocorura, Sais, Sata, Schedia, Sebennytus, Sela, Sethroë, Syene, Tamiathis (now Damietta; geographically identical with Damiata), Tanasia, Tanis, Taua, Tentyris, Terenuthis, Thennesus, Theodosiopolis in Arcadia, Thinis, Thmuis, Thois, Xois, Zygris
 Titular Apostolic Vicariates (both Latin and merged as titles with co-cathedrals into the residential Latin Apostolic Vicariate of Alexandria) : Heliopolis of Egypt (a Cairo suburb) and Port-Said (Suez Canal port)

Other 
(incomplete?)
 Latin Patriarchate of Alexandria (long titular before its suppression, originally a diocese)

See also 

 Catholic Church in Egypt

Sources and external links
 GCatholic.org with see - and incumbent biography links.
 Catholic-Hierarchy entry.

Egypt
Catholic dioceses